Nazism created an elaborate system of propaganda, which made use of the new technologies of the 20th century, including cinema. Nazism courted the masses by the means of slogans that were aimed directly at the instincts and emotions of the people. The Nazis valued film as a propaganda instrument of enormous power. The interest that Adolf Hitler and his propaganda minister Joseph Goebbels took in film was not only the result of a personal fascination. The use of film for propaganda had been planned by the Nazi Party as early as 1930, when the party first established a film department. The goals of the department included using the economic power of German moviegoers to self-censor films globally, resulting in all but one Hollywood producers censoring films critical of Nazism and even showing news shorts of film produced by the Nazis in American theaters. No American films between 1933-1939 were critical of Nazism.

Background

The Nazis were very aware of the propagandistic effect of movies and already in 1920 the issues of the Racial Observer included film criticism. The SS-philosopher Walter Julius Bloem published the book The Soul of the Cinema – A Commitment to the Movies in 1922.

In September 1923, Philipp Nickel produced a documentary of the "German Day in Nuremberg" where the "Battle-League" was founded, shortly before the Beer Hall Putsch. Hitler wrote about the psychological effect of images in Mein Kampf:
One must also remember that of itself the multitude is mentally inert, that it remains attached to its old habits and that it is not naturally prone to read something which does not conform with its own pre-established beliefs when such writing does not contain what the multitude hopes to find there.
The picture, in all its forms, including the film, has better prospects.  In a much shorter time, at one stroke I might say, people will understand a pictorial presentation of something which it would take them a long and laborious effort of reading to understand.

A comprehensive critique of the film industry was published by the Nazi economist Hans Buchner in 1927 with the title "Spellbound by Movies. The Global Dominance of the Cinema". Further short Nazi films about party rallies were made in 1927–1929. The first NSDAP film office was established in 1931, and started producing "documentaries" in a larger scale, e.g., in 1932 "Hitlers Kampf um Deutschland" (Hitler's fight for Germany), "Blutendes Deutschland" (Germany is bleeding), "Das junge Deutschland marschiert" (The German Youth is on the March). Herbert Gerdes directed five Nazi propaganda films: Erbkrank (1936), Alles Leben ist Kampf (1937), Was du Ererbt (1938), Schuld oder Schein (1921), and Das Große Geheimnis (1920).

Nazi propagandist Hans Traub, who had earned his PhD in 1925 with a dissertation on the press and the German revolutions of 1848–49, wrote in the essay "The film as a political instrument" in 1932:
Without any doubt the film is a formidable means of propaganda. Achieving propagandistic influence has always demanded a ‘language’ which forms a memorable and passionate plot with a simple narrative. … In the vast area of such ’language’ that the recipients are directly confronted by in the course of technical and economical processes, the most effective is the moving picture. It demands permanent alertness; it’s full of surprises concerning the change of time, space, and action; it has an unimaginable richness of rhythm for intensifying or dispelling emotions.

Goals of the Nazi film policy

Goebbels, who appointed himself "Patron of the German film", believed that a national cinema which was entertaining and put glamour on the government would be a more effective propaganda instrument than a national cinema in which the NSDAP and their policy would have been ubiquitous. Goebbels emphasized the will to end the "shamelessness and tastelessness" that he thought could be found in the former movie industry. The main goal of the Nazi film policy was to promote escapism, which was designed to distract the population and to keep everybody in good spirits; Goebbels indeed blamed defeat in World War I on the failure to sustain the morale of the people.

The open propaganda was reserved for films like Der Sieg des Glaubens and Triumph des Willens, records of the Nuremberg rallies, and newsreels. There are some examples of Nazi-era feature films that deal with the NSDAP or with party organizations such as the Sturmabteilung, Hitler Youth or the National Labour Service, one example being Hitlerjunge Quex about the Hitler Youth. Another example is the anti-semitic feature film Jew Suss. The propaganda films that refer directly to Nazi politics amounted to less than a sixth of the whole national film production, which mainly consisted of light entertainment films.

For conceiving a Nazi film theory, Goebbels suggested as formative material the Hamburg Dramaturgy and Laokoon, or the Limitations of Poetry by Gotthold Ephraim Lessing, and also demanded "realistic characters" pointing to Shakespeare. Goebbels emphasized Lessing's idea that "not only imagining per se, but purposeful imagining, would prove the creative mind".

Emil Jannings wrote in 1942 in the National Socialist Monthly about the goal of showing men and women who can master their own fate as models for identification.
The authorities and NSDAP departments in charge of film policy were the film department of the Ministry of Propaganda, the Chamber of Culture (Reichskulturkammer), the Chamber of Film (Reichsfilmkammer), and the film department of the Party Propaganda Department (Reichspropagandaleitung).

A system of "award" was used to encourage self-censorship; awarded for such things as "cultural value" or "value to the people", they remitted part of the heavy taxes on films. Up to a third of the films in Nazi Germany received such awards.

Censorship abroad

Summary 
Anything that hinted at national weakness or promoted democracy were banned in the country along with other studio projects if they portrayed an image of Germany or history that the Nazis did not want the world to see. They also censored films for moral, political and eugenic infractions. This uniquely aggressive and effective suppressive of speech through film left only the small independent art house films where one could find stories critical of the Nazis in the 1930's, not unlike where one might find movies critical of China in the 21st century.

Timeline 
All Quiet on the Western Front was so upsetting to Nazi officials watching the screening in Berlin in December 1930 that it was stopped mid-screening and many edits had to be made before it could be re-released. Universal scrapped all scenes that portrayed Germans in a negative light, and the Germans agreed to screen the film again only if Universal released the censored version worldwide as well.

Using the significant economic power of German moviegoers to self-censor films globally, resulting in all but one Hollywood producers censoring films critical of Nazism and even showing news shorts of film produced by the Nazis in American theaters. No American films that were made between 1933-1939 were critical of Nazism, including those released domestically. Warner Brothers, the lone US production company without a partnership with the Nazis, had pulled out of Germany in 1934 after one of its Jewish employees was assaulted in Germany. Paramount, MGM and Fox all kept working with the German market, in part because their revenue was often frozen in German banks and not released right away. Fox and Paramount even collaborated on news reels with the Nazis that were shipped all around the world, in the hopes of getting their frozen assets back.

Warner Brothers released the first film with a plot critical of Nazis in May 1939, it also fueled unfounded fears of jewish refugees acting as Nazi spies and contributed to the further restriction of jewish refugees from Europe. Hollywood's presence started to come under increasing scrutiny after Kristallnacht in 1938, and a wholesale retreat from the country took place in mid-1940, in part because of declining sales in Germany.

These new incentives put in place by the nazis led to Universal scrapping a project about the sinking of the Lusitania and Paramount delaying its sequel to All Quiet on the Western Front to 1936. When production started on The Road Back, all the actors received a letter from a Georg Gyssling that none of them would be able to work on projects shown in Germany. Despite the uproar that ensued, the production got made with 21 preemptive cuts made, including a sanitized ending that made the world, not Germany, seem culpable for militarism, but Universal still got kicked out of the country in retaliation. Nazis insisted on edits to Warner Brother's film Captured! that showed poor treatment of prisoners by the hands of Germans, and further punished the studio even after they made those edits by blocking subsequent releases that were expected to perform well in Germany. MGM's cancellation of the anti-Nazi movie Are We Civilized? led to a dozen of their films being approved a week later. The Mad Dog of Europe, one of the first attempts to dramatize Hitler, was dissuaded from going further by the MPAA in 1933, who worried that all American films would be banned from Germany in retaliation.

Goebbels also kept lists of which actors and crew were Jewish or anti-Nazi and refused to import films on which they worked. His emissary in Los Angeles, Georg Gyssling, kept an eye on Hollywood scripts and activities, including writing letters to Will H. Hays' office when he found something that he or his bosses didn't like.

Measures of the Nazi film policy

To subdue film to the goals of propaganda (Gleichschaltung), the Nazi Party subordinated the entire film industry and administration under Joseph Goebbels' Ministry of Propaganda, and gradually nationalized film production and distribution. A state-run professional school for politically reliable film-makers (Deutsche Filmakademie Babelsberg) was founded, and membership of an official professional organization (Reichsfilmkammer) was made mandatory for all actors, film-makers, distributors, etc. The censorship that had already been established during World War I and the Weimar Republic was increased, with a National Film Dramaturgist (Reichsfilmdramaturg) pre-censoring all manuscripts and screenplays at the very first stages of production. Film criticism was prohibited and a national film award established.

A film bank (Filmkreditbank GmbH) was established to provide low-interest loans for the production of politically welcome films, and such films also received tax benefits.

Film production

In the mid-1930s, the German film industry suffered the most severe crisis it had ever faced, due to many of the most capable actors and film-makers having left the country after the rise to power of the Nazi government; while others had been banned by the new Reichsfilmkammer. Secondly, the remaining actors and film-makers seized the opportunity to demand higher salaries, which considerably increased production budgets. Consequently, it became more and more difficult to recover production costs. Thirdly, the export of German films dramatically dropped due to international boycotts. In 1933, exports had covered 44% of film production costs; by 1937, this figure had dropped to 7%.

More and more production companies went bankrupt. The number of companies dropped from 114 (1933–35) to 79 (1936–38) to 38 (1939–41). This did not necessarily lead to a decrease in the number of new films, as the remaining production companies produced many more films. Nazi companies went on to produce co-productions with companies of other countries: eight co-productions with the Kingdom of Italy, six co-productions with the French Third Republic, five co-productions with the Kingdom of Hungary, 5 co-productions with Czechoslovakia, 3 co-productions with Switzerland, two co-productions with the Second Polish Republic and the Empire of Japan (e.g., The Daughter of the Samurai), and one each with Francoist Spain, the United States, the Kingdom of Yugoslavia, and Sweden.

The consolidation of the film industry benefited the Nazi government as a small number of big film production companies were easier to control than a multitude of small ones. Goebbels went even further and directed a holding company – Cautio Treuhand GmbH – to buy up the stock majorities of the remaining film production companies.

State subsidies to the film industry resulted in improved production values: average film production costs quintupled from 250,000 ℛℳ in 1933 to 1,380,000 ℛℳ in 1942. Ticket sales within the Reich quadrupled from 250 million in 1933 to more than a billion in 1942. Box-office sales more than doubled from 441 million ℛℳ in 1938 (equivalent to  billion  €) to over 1 billion ℛℳ in 1942 (equivalent to  billion  €).

In 1937, the Cautio acquired the largest German production company, Universum Film AG, and in 1942 merged this company with the remaining companies – Terra Film, Tobis, Bavaria Film, Wien-Film and Berlin-Film – into the so-called Ufi-Group. The entire German film industry had been practically nationalized but remained nominally a private industry. Goebbels founded the Filmkreditbank GmbH in order to fund the industry but the funds came from private investors. The industry was forced to remain profitable to produce films that met the expectations of the audience.

Ufi was a vertically integrated monopoly, covering the entire European film market under German hegemony, with foreign imports cut off. The company's profits surged, reaching 155 million ℛℳ in 1942 (equivalent to  million  €) and 175 million ℛℳ in 1943 (equivalent to  million  €).

Nazi regime's national film award winners 

Officially honored films considered by the Nazis to be "artistically valuable" (German: künstlerisch wertvoll) by the state (* = predicate "special political value" – introduced in 1934, + = predicate "special traditional value" (German: volkstümlich wertvoll), ** = predicate "film of the nation"  introduced in 1941):

{| class="wikitable" style="font-size:100%"
|- style="text-align:center;"
! style="background:#B0C4DE;" | Year
! style="background:#B0C4DE;" | Title
|-
| 1933
|
S.A.-Mann Brand (dir. Franz Seitz, Sr.) 
Hitlerjunge Quex i.e., Hitler Youth Quex (dir. Hans Steinhoff) 
Reifende Jugend i.e., Maturing Youth (dir. Carl Froelich) 
Flüchtlinge i.e., Refugees (dir. Gustav Ucicky)
|-
| 1934
|
Ich für dich, du für mich i.e., I for you, you for me (dir. Carl Froelich) 
Der Schimmelreiter i.e., The Rider on the White Horse (dir. Curt Oertel, Hans Deppe), based on the novella by Theodor Storm
Der verlorene Sohn i.e., The Prodigal Son (dir. Luis Trenker)
Der Herr der Welt i.e., Master of the World (dir. Harry Piel)
*Stoßtrupp 1917 i.e., Shock Troop 1917 (dir. Hans Zöberlein, Ludwig Schmid-Wildy)
Krach um Jolanthe i.e., Trouble with Jolanthe (dir. Carl Froelich), based on a book by August Hinrichs
|-
| 1935
|
*Hermine und die sieben Aufrechten i.e., Hermine and the Seven Upright Men (dir. Frank Wisbar)
Liebesleute – Hermann und Dorothea von Heute i.e., A Pair of Lovers – Hermann and Dorothea of today (dir. Erich Waschneck)
Mazurka (dir. Willi Forst)
Artisten (dir. Harry Piel)
Liebe geht – wohin sie will i. ., Love goes – wherever it wants to (dir. Kurt Skalden)
*Der alte und der junge König i.e., The old and the young King (dir. Hans Steinhoff)
*Das Mädchen Johanna i.e., Lass Joan (dir. Gustav Ucicky), a film about the French heroine Joan of Arc
Friesennot i.e., Frisians in Hardship (dir. Willi Krause)
Henker, Frauen und Soldaten i.e., Hangmen, Women and Soldiers (dir. Johannes Meyer), a film about two cousins, one fighting on the German side in the Freikorps, the other fighting on the bolshevist (proto-soviet) side
*Liselotte von der Pfalz i.e., The Private Life of Louis XIV (dir. Carl Froelich), about Elizabeth Charlotte, Princess of the Palatinate 
Papageno (dir. Lotte Reiniger)
*Der höhere Befehl i.e., The Higher Command (dir. Gerhard Lamprecht)
|-
| 1936
|
Das Schönheitsfleckchen i.e., The Beauty Spot (dir. Rolf Hansen)
*Traumulus i.e., The Dreamer (dir. Carl Froelich)
Drei Mäderl um Schubert i.e., Three Girls around Schubert (dir. E. W. Emo), based on a novel by Rudolf Hans Bartsch 
Stadt Anatol i.e., City of Anatol (dir. Victor Tourjansky)
Stärker als Paragraphen i.e., Stronger than Paragraphs (dir. Jürgen von Alten)
Wenn der Hahn kräht i.e., When the cock crows (dir. Carl Froelich)
Schlußakkord i.e., Final Chord (dir. Douglas Sirk) 
Savoy Hotel 217 (dir. Gustav Ucicky), a crime story in the Russian Empire
Fährmann Maria i.e., Ferryman Maria (dir. Frank Wisbar)
Glückskinder i.e., Lucky Kids (dir. Paul Martin) 
90 Minuten Aufenthalt i.e., 90-Minute-Stopover (dir. Harry Piel), a real time film about two friends, a German and a British criminal investigator who solve a case in Lisbon
Der Dschungel ruft i.e., The Jungle Calls (dir. Harry Piel)
Der Bettelstudent i.e., The Beggar Student (dir. Georg Jacoby), based on the play by Carl Millöcker 
Allotria i.e., Tomfoolery (dir. Willi Forst)
*Der Kaiser von Kalifornien i.e., The Kaiser of California (dir. Luis Trenker)
*Verräter i.e., The Traitor (dir. Karl Ritter)
*Wenn wir alle Engel wären i.e., If We All Were Angels (dir. Carl Froelich)
|-
| 1937
|
*Der Herrscher i.e., The Sovereign (dir. Veit Harlan)
*Patrioten i.e., Patriots (dir. Karl Ritter) 
Mein Sohn, der Herr Minister i.e., My Son, the Government Minister (dir. Veit Harlan), a comedy making fun of the parliamentary system 
Der Mann, der Sherlock Holmes war i.e., The Man Who Was Sherlock Holmes (dir. Karl Hartl)
Gewitterflug zu Claudia i.e., Stormy flight to Claudia (dir. Erich Waschneck)
*Der zerbrochene Krug i.e., The Broken Jug (dir. Gustav Ucicky), based on the play by Heinrich von Kleist 
*Condottieri (dir. Luis Trenker, Werner Klingler), about Cesare Borgia and Caterina Sforza
*Die Tochter des Samurai i.e., The Daughter of the Samurai (dir. Arnold Fanck, Mansaku Itami) 
*Urlaub auf Ehrenwort i.e., Leave on Word of Honor (dir. Karl Ritter)
|-
| 1938
|
Revolutionshochzeit i.e., Revolution-Marriage (dir. Hans Heinz Zerlett)
*Heimat (dir. Carl Froelich)
Der Berg ruft i.e., The Mountain Calls (dir. Luis Trenker), about the first ascent of the Matterhorn; based on a novel by Carl Haensel
Das Verlegenheitskind (dir. Peter Paul Brauer)
Jugend i.e. Youth (dir. Veit Harlan), based on a play by Max Halbe 
Der Fall Deruga i.e., The Deruga Case (dir. Fritz Peter Buch), based on a novel by Ricarda Huch
Mit versiegelter Order (dir. Karl Anton)
Liebelei und Liebe i.e., Flirtation and Love (dir. Arthur Maria Rabenalt) 
Napoleon ist an allem schuld i.e., Napoleon Is to Blame for Everything (dir. Curt Goetz), about a man who studies Napoleon's biography and therefore neglects his wife
Geheimzeichen LB 17 i.e., Secret Code LB 17 (dir. Victor Tourjansky)
Verwehte Spuren i.e., Covered Tracks, (dir. Veit Harlan)
Verklungene Melodie i.e., Faded Melody, (dir. Victor Tourjansky)
 i.e., Dance on the Volcano (dir. Hans Steinhoff), about Jean-Gaspard Deburau
*Der Katzensteg (dir. Fritz Peter Buch)
*Kautschuk i.e., Caoutchouc (dir. Eduard von Borsody) 
Die Umwege des schönen Karl i.e., The Roundabouts of Handsome Karl (dir. Carl Froelich)
*Pour le Mérite (dir. Karl Ritter)
|-
| 1939
|
Es war eine rauschende Ballnacht i.e., It was an Amazing Night at the Ball (dir. Carl Froelich), a film about the Russian composer Pyotr Ilyich Tchaikovsky
Der Schritt vom Wege i.e., The False Step (dir. Gustaf Gründgens), based on the novel Effi Briest by Theodor Storm 
Flucht ins Dunkel i.e., Escape in the Dark (dir. Arthur Maria Rabenalt) 
*Aufruhr in Damaskus i.e., Uproar in Damascus (dir. Gustav Ucicky)
Ein ganzer Kerl i.e., A Real Man (dir. Fritz Peter Buch)
Johannisfeuer i.e., Midsummer Night's Fire (dir. Arthur Maria Rabenalt), based on the book by Hermann Sudermann
Der Florentiner Hut i.e., The Leghorn Hat (dir. Wolfgang Liebeneiner), based on the play Un Chapeau de paille d'Italie by Eugène Marin Labiche 
Befreite Hände i.e., Liberated Hands (dir. Hans Schweikart)
Männer müssen so sein i.e., Men Have To Be That Way (dir. Arthur Maria Rabenalt) 
Hotel Sacher (dir. Erich Engel)
Opernball i.e., Opera Ball (dir. Géza von Bolváry) 
*+Robert Koch, der Bekämpfer des Todes i.e., Robert Koch, fighting death (dir. Hans Steinhoff)
*Mutterliebe i.e., A Mother's Love (dir. Gustav Ucicky)
|-
| 1940
|
Der Postmeister i.e., The Postmaster (dir. Gustav Ucicky)
*Wunschkonzert i.e., Request Concert (dir. Eduard von Borsody) 
Wiener G'schichten i.e., Vienna Tales (dir. Géza von Bolváry) 
Die Geierwally i.e., The Vulture Wally (dir. Hans Steinhoff), based on a novel by Wilhelmine von Hillern 
Das Herz der Königin i.e., The Heart of the Queen (dir. Carl Froelich), about Mary, Queen of Scots
*Friedrich Schiller – Der Triumph eines Genies i.e., Friedrich Schiller – The Triumph of a Genius (dir. Herbert Maisch)
*Feinde i.e., Enemies (dir. Victor Tourjansky)
*Jud Süß (dir. Veit Harlan)
*Bismarck (dir. Wolfgang Liebeneiner)
|-
| 1941
|
Friedemann Bach (dir. Traugott Müller), a film about Johann Sebastian Bach's son Wilhelm Friedemann Bach 
Ich klage an i.e., I accuse (dir. Wolfgang Liebeneiner)
*Mein Leben für Irland i.e., My Life for Ireland (dir. Max W. Kimmich)
*Kampfgeschwader Lützow (dir. Hans Bertram)
*Annelie (dir. Josef von Báky)
Auf Wiedersehn, Franziska i.e., Goodbye, Franziska (dir. Helmut Käutner) Quax, der Bruchpilot (dir. Kurt Hoffmann) *Kopf hoch, Johannes! i.e., Cheer up, Johannes! (dir. Viktor de Kowa) Operette i.e., Operetta (dir. Willi Forst), about Franz Jauner and the establishment of the Viennese Operetta Immer nur Du i.e., You, always (dir. Karl Anton)Die schwedische Nachtigall i.e., The Swedish Nightingale (dir. Peter Paul Brauer), about Jenny Lind and Hans Christian Andersen*Komödianten i.e., The Comedians (dir. Georg Wilhelm Pabst)**Ohm Krüger (dir. Hans Steinhoff)**Heimkehr i.e., Coming Home (dir. Gustav Ucicky)
|-
| 1942
|Wiener Blut i.e., Vienna Blood (dir. Willi Forst), a romantic comedy film about the Congress of Vienna*Zwei in einer großen Stadt i.e., Two in a Big City (dir. Volker von Collande) Die goldene Stadt i.e., The Golden City (dir. Veit Harlan)Rembrandt (dir. Hans Steinhoff), about the Dutch painter Rembrandt van Rijn Der große Schatten i.e., The Great Shadow (dir. Paul Verhoeven)Kleine Residenz i.e., Little residence (dir. Hans Heinz Zerlett)*Hände hoch! i.e., Hands Up! (dir. Alfred Weidenmann)*Diesel (dir. Gerhard Lamprecht), about Rudolf Diesel+Anuschka (dir. Helmut Käutner)Meine Frau Teresa i.e., My Wife Theresa (dir. Arthur Maria Rabenalt) *Andreas Schlüter (dir. Herbert Maisch), about sculptor and architect Andreas Schlüter*Wen die Götter lieben i.e., Whom the Gods Love (dir. Karl Hartl), about Wolfgang Amadeus Mozart*Der Strom i.e., The River (dir. Günther Rittau)Die Nacht in Venedig i.e., The Night in Venice (dir. Paul Verhoeven)*+Die große Liebe i.e., The Great Love (dir. Rolf Hansen)**Der große König i.e., The Great King (dir. Veit Harlan)**Die Entlassung i.e., The Dismissal (dir. Wolfgang Liebeneiner)Wir machen Musik i.e., We Make Music (dir. Helmut Käutner), about a composer whose idols are Johann Sebastian Bach and the like, but who himself fails as a composer of Art music and then succeeds making popular music
|-
| 1943
|Sophienlund (dir. Heinz Rühmann)Romanze in Moll i.e., Romance in a Minor Key (dir. Helmut Käutner)Der ewige Klang i.e., The Eternal Sound (dir. Günther Rittau), about two brothers, a violinist and a violin maker, guest star: Georges Boulanger, singing: Elisabeth SchwarzkopfFrauen sind keine Engel i.e., Women are not Angels (dir. Willi Forst)+Immensee (dir. Veit Harlan), based on the novella by Theodor Storm*Germanin – Die Geschichte einer kolonialen Tat i.e., Germanin – the history of a colonial deed (dir. Max W. Kimmich, Luis Trenker), about the development of Suramin "to save Africa" from trypanosomiasisAltes Herz wird wieder jung i.e., Old heart rejuvenated (dir. Erich Engel)Armer Hansi i.e., Poor Hansi (dir. Gerhard Fieber), animated film by the Deutsche Zeichentrickfilme G.m.b.H Zirkus Renz (dir. Arthur Maria Rabenalt), about the Circus Renz Späte Liebe i.e., Late Love (dir. Gustav Ucicky), about a man who is estranged from his wife but finally they really find together Damals i.e., Back Then (dir. Rolf Hansen)*Wien 1910 i.e., Vienna 1910 (dir. E. W. Emo), about the mayor of Vienna Karl Lueger*Paracelsus (dir. Georg Wilhelm Pabst), about the Swiss German philosopher Paracelsus Ein glücklicher Mensch i.e., A joyful person (dir. Paul Verhoeven), about a famous chemistry professor, based on the play "Swedenhielms" by Hjalmar BergmanDer weiße Traum i.e., The White Dream (dir. Géza von Cziffra)Großstadtmelodie i.e., Melody of a Great City (dir. Wolfgang Liebeneiner) *Der unendliche Weg i.e., The Endless Road (dir. Hans Schweikart)
|-
| 1944
|Der gebieterische Ruf i.e., The Masterful Calling (dir. Gustav Ucicky)Die Feuerzangenbowle i.e., The Punch Bowl (dir. Helmut Weiss)*Philharmoniker i.e., Philharmonic (dir. Paul Verhoeven)Träumerei i.e., Dreaming (dir. Harald Braun), about Robert Schumann Das Herz muss schweigen (dir. Gustav Ucicky)Familie Buchholz i.e., The Buchholz Family (dir. Carl Froelich), based on a novel by Julius StindeOrientexpreß i.e., Orient Express (dir. Victor Tourjansky)+Neigungsehe i.e., Marriage of Affection (dir. Carl Froelich)Opfergang i.e., Way of Sacrifice (dir. Veit Harlan)
|-
| 1945
|**Kolberg (dir. Veit Harlan)
|}

Film distribution

A concentration also took place in the distribution field. In 1942, the Ufa-owned Deutsche Filmvertriebs GmbH (DFV) took the place of all companies so far remaining. For the export of films to foreign countries special companies had been established such as the Cinéma Film AG.

Since the period of the Weimar Republic, there had also existed an extensive system of educational film hire services which was extended under the Nazi administration. In 1943, there were 37 regional services and 12,042 city services. In parallel, the Party Propaganda Department (Reichspropagandaleitung) ran its own network of educational film hire services which included 32 Gaue, 171 district, and 22,357 local services. All film hire services had extensive film collections as well as rental 16 mm film projectors available that made it possible to show films in any class or lecture room and at any group meeting of the Hitler Youth.

Cinemas

Apart from the Ufa-owned cinema chain, the cinemas were not nationalized. The majority of the 5,506 cinemas that existed in 1939 within the so-called Altreich (the "Old Reich", i.e., Germany without Austria and the Sudetenland) were small companies run by private owners. However, a large number of rules and regulations issued by the Reichsfilmkammer limited the entrepreneurial freedom of the cinemas considerably. It was mandatory to include a documentary and a newsreel in every film programme. By a law of 1933 (the Gesetz über die Vorführung ausländischer Bildstreifen vom 23. Juni 1933), the government was also entitled to prohibit the presentation of foreign films. An import quota for foreign films had been set during the Weimar Republic, and during World War II, the import of films from certain foreign countries was completely prohibited. For example, from 1941 onwards, the presentation of American films became illegal.

A quantitative comparison of the percentage of German movies screened vs. foreign movies screened shows the following numbers: in the last year of the Weimar Republic the percentage of German movies was 62%; by 1939 it had risen to 77% while the number of cinema visits increased by the factor 2.5 from 1933 to 1939. On the contrary the percentage of for example American movies screened was reduced from 26% in 1932 to 14% in 1939; from 1933 to 1937 eleven US movies were considered "artistically valuable" by the Nazi authorities (e.g., The Lives of a Bengal Lancer).

In order to boost the propaganda effect, the Nazis supported film shows in large cinemas with large audiences where the feeling of being part of the crowd was so overwhelming for the individual spectator that critical film perception had little chance. Film shows also took place in military barracks and factories. The Hitler Youth arranged special film programmes (Jugendfilmstunden) where newsreels and propaganda films were shown. In order to supply even rural and remote areas with film shows, the Party Propaganda Department (Reichspropagandaleitung) operated 300 film trucks and two film trains that carried all the necessary equipment for showing films in, for example, village inns. The Nazis intended to use television as a medium for their propaganda once the number of television sets was increased, but television was able initially to reach only a small number of viewers, in contrast to radio. Only a small number of the Einheitsempfänger TV also called People's TV, were produced.

Film propaganda had the highest priority in Germany even under the severe conditions of the last years of World War II. While schools and playhouses stopped working in 1944, cinemas continued to operate until the very end of the war. In Berlin for instance, anti-aircraft units were posted specially to protect the local cinemas in 1944.

Star system

There always had been film stars in Germany, but a star system comparable to the star system in Hollywood did not yet exist. Nazi leaders denounced the star system as a Jewish invention. However, in order to improve the image of Nazi Germany, Goebbels made great efforts to form a star system. After Marlene Dietrich and Greta Garbo had gone to Hollywood and could not be persuaded to serve the National Socialist film industry as figureheads, new film stars were promoted.

The best-known example is the Swedish actress Zarah Leander who was hired in 1937 by Ufa and became the most prominent and highest-paid German film star in only a few years. The publicity campaign for Leander was run by the press office of the Ufa, which concealed her past as a film actress already well known in Sweden and put their money right away on her charisma as a singer with an exceptionally deep voice. The Ufa press office provided the newspapers with detailed instructions on how the new star would have to be presented, and even the actress herself had to follow detailed instructions whenever she appeared in public. This kind of star publicity had not existed in Germany before.

Prominent politicians such as Hitler, Goebbels, and Hermann Göring appeared in public flanked by popular German film actors. The female stars in particular were expected to lend some glamour to the dry and male-dominated NSDAP events. Hitler's preferred dinner partners were the actresses Olga Tschechowa and Lil Dagover, and from 1935, Hermann Göring was married to the popular actress Emmy Sonnemann. The relationships of Goebbels to several female film stars are also notorious. Magda Goebbels left a screening of the film Die Reise nach Tilsit, because it seemed to her too close a telling of her husband's relationship with Lída Baarová, which had resulted in the actress being sent back to her native Czechoslovakia.

Personal proximity to the political leaders became a determining factor for the career success of film actors. An informal system of listings decided how frequently an actor would be cast. The five categories extended from "to cast at all costs even without a vacancy" (for instance Zarah Leander, Lil Dagover, Heinz Rühmann) to "casting under no circumstances welcome".

How crucial the film stars were for the image of the National Socialist government is also evident from the tax benefits that Hitler decreed in 1938 for prominent film actors and directors. From that time on, they could deduct 40% of their income as professional expenses.

The Nazi film theorist Fritz Hippler wrote in his 1942 book Contemplations on Film-Making: "Enough has been written as to whether 'celebritism' is beneficial or harmful—but one way or the other, it cannot be denied that throughout the world a main motive of people going to the movies is to see the faces they know and love" and Hippler suggested that the stars to be chosen for Nazi cinema should have "European standard" and at the same time appeal to the "Germans' ideal of beauty", so that Germans could identify with them. Non-German actors in the Nazi cinema included Zarah Leander, Marika Rökk, Lída Baarová, Pola Negri, Adina Mandlová, Johannes Heesters, Iván Petrovich, Laura Solari, Angelo Ferrari, Nikolay Fyodorovich Kolin, Boris Alekin (Russian), Igo Sym (Polish), Rosita Serrano (Chilean). The Russian Victor Tourjansky and the Hungarian Géza von Bolváry were popular non-German directors.

In 1944, Joseph Goebbels issued a list with "irreplaceable artists" called the Gottbegnadeten list, which included people such as Arno Breker, Richard Strauss, and Johannes Heesters.

During World War II, German film stars supported the war effort by performing for the troops or by collecting money for the German Winter Relief Organization (Winterhilfswerk). Although most of the male stars were exempted from military service, some – such as the popular Heinz Rühmann – participated in the war as soldiers, often accompanied by newsreel film crews.

See also

 List of German films of 1933–1945
 List of Nazi propaganda films
 Cinema of Germany
 Reichsfilmarchiv (an archive for films created under Nazi rule)
 Why We Fight, an American answer to Nazi propaganda films during the World War II years

Citations

References

  Albrecht, Gerd (1969). Nationalsozialistische Filmpolitik. Munich: Hanser.
  Spiker, Jürgen (1975). Film und Kapital. Der Weg der deutschen Filmwirtschaft zum nationalsozialistischen Einheitskonzern. Berlin: Volker Spiess. 
 This article is translated from its equivalent on the German Wikipedia''

External Links
 1941 - Heimkehr (1h 28m)

Cinema of Germany
Mass media of Nazi Germany
 
 
Joseph Goebbels